Farderin bin Kadir (born 30 January 1987, in Malacca) is a Malaysian footballer who mainly plays as a striker but can also plays as an attacking midfielder for Persib Bandung. He is also a member of the Malaysia U-23 squad and a former member of the Malaysia U-20 squad.

Club career
Farderin started his professional career with the Malaysia U-20 squad in 2004. He was also a striker for Malacca FA, Kuala Muda Naza FC and then with Selangor FA. He broke into Malacca's starting eleven during the 2005/06 season and netted 2 goals in his first season. In the 2006/07 season he scored 4 goals.

He played in the 2006 AFC Youth Championship in India. He also played one Olympic Games qualification match against Hong Kong under-23 for Malaysia's under-23 side. For the 2007/08 season Farderin transferred to Kuala Muda NAZA FC. He helped the team win the 2007/08 Malaysia Premier League by scoring one of the goals in Kuala Muda NAZA's 3–2 win over KL PLUS FC. He was voted man of the match.

He was later loaned to Perlis FA for the 2008 Malaysia Cup. Farderin's performance attracted attention from national coach B. Sathianathan, who put him into the senior team for the 2008 Merdeka Tournament. However, he did not have the chance to play a match during the tournament.

Farderin made his debut with the senior national team in an unofficial match against Zimbabwe on 12 July 2009. He also scored his first goal for the senior team in that match.

Following a spell with Malaysian giants Selangor FA, he then join newly promoted Felda United FC.

Career statistics

Club

Achievements
 2007/08 Malaysia Premier League Champion

References

External links
 Kuala Muda NAZA Squad
 Farderin Kadir's at  selangorfc.com 

1987 births
Living people
Malaysian footballers
Terengganu FC players
Perlis FA players
PKNS F.C. players
Negeri Sembilan FA players
Malaysia international footballers
Kuala Muda Naza F.C. players
People from Malacca
Malaysian people of Malay descent
Association football forwards